"Your Possible Pasts" (mislabeled as "Your Impossible Pasts" on a radio promo single) is a song from Pink Floyd's 1983 album The Final Cut. This song was one of several to be considered for the band's "best of" album, Echoes: The Best of Pink Floyd.

Background
The song, like many others on The Final Cut, is a rewritten version of a song rejected for The Wall, originally to be used in Spare Bricks (an early version of The Final Cut that was an extension of The Wall.) Guitarist David Gilmour objected to the use of these previously rejected tracks, as he believed that they weren't good enough for release:

Despite not appearing on The Wall album, the lyrics of the chorus did appear in the film for said album, Pink Floyd – The Wall, where the lyrics were read by the main character, Pink, in-between the songs "Waiting for the Worms" and "Stop".

"Your Possible Pasts" also appeared on a 12-inch promotional single entitled Selections from The Final Cut, with "The Final Cut" on the B-side. However, despite not being released as a commercial single, the song did receive significant radio play, resulting in the song hitting number 8 on the Billboard Mainstream Rock chart in America.

Lyrics 

The first verse describes poppies entwining with "cattle trucks lying in wait for the next time", an allusion to the railway vehicles used in The Holocaust.

The line "Do you remember me, how we used to be?" originally appeared in the song "Incarceration of a Flower Child", written by Waters in 1968. Neither Pink Floyd nor Waters recorded the song; however, it was recorded by Marianne Faithfull in 1999 for her album Vagabond Ways.

Reception
AllMusic critic Stewart Mason said of the song:

Chris Ott of Pitchfork Media described the song as:

Personnel
 Roger Waters – bass guitar, acoustic guitar, tape effects, sound effects, and vocals
 David Gilmour – electric guitars
 Nick Mason – drums

with:
 Michael Kamen – electric piano and orchestrations
 Andy Bown – Hammond organ
 Ray Cooper – percussion

References

Bibliography
 

1983 songs
Pink Floyd songs
Anti-war songs
Songs written by Roger Waters
Song recordings produced by Roger Waters